He Zhengyang (born 31 January 1997) is a Chinese sports shooter.

References

1997 births
Living people
Chinese male sport shooters
Olympic shooters of China
Shooters at the 2020 Summer Olympics
21st-century Chinese people